Vladimir Tsepelyov (born 10 October 1956) is a retired long jumper who represented the USSR. He won two medals at the European Indoor Championships as well as a bronze medal at the 1978 European Championships in Athletics.

Achievements

References

External links
 IAAF profile

1956 births
Living people
Soviet male long jumpers
Russian male long jumpers
European Athletics Championships medalists